The Jack Creek Guard Station is a ranger patrol cabin in Medicine Bow National Forest in Carbon County, Wyoming. The one-room log cabin was built by U.S. Forest Service district ranger Evan John Williams in 1933-34. It was built to Forest Service Plan A-4, featuring half-dovetailed corners and a deep front porch with a gabled wood shake roof. A stove is vented through a brick chimney at the back of the cabin.

In his career with the Forest Service Williams built or renovated five other ranger stations one hundred miles of trail, two fire lookouts and miles of fencing and telephone line. Williams died in 1970. His ashes are interred a short distance behind the cabin.

The Jack Creek Guard Station was placed on the National Register of Historic Places on May 15, 1986.

References

External links
 Jack Creek Guard Station at the Wyoming State Historic Preservation Office

National Register of Historic Places in Carbon County, Wyoming
Buildings and structures completed in 1934
United States Forest Service architecture
1934 establishments in Wyoming